Kirindi Oya is a river in Sri Lanka. Starting from Bandarawela it flows for  down to Bundala.

See also
 Ravana Falls
 List of rivers of Sri Lanka

References

Rivers of Sri Lanka